Trent Rockets are a franchise 100-ball cricket side based in the city of Nottingham. The team represents the historic counties of Nottinghamshire, Derbyshire and Leicestershire in the newly founded The Hundred competition, which took place for the first time in the 2021 English and Welsh cricket season. Both the men's and women's sides play at Trent Bridge.

History 

The announcement of the new eight-team men's and women's tournament series in 2019 was not without controversy, with the likes of Virat Kohli criticising the England and Wales Cricket Board for pursuing a shift away from Test cricket, while others argued the format should have followed the established and successful Twenty20 format. The ECB however decided it needed a unique format to draw crowds.

In February 2021 the side announced that former Zimbabwe cricketer Andy Flower would be the men's team's first coach, while former Yorkshire women's player Salliann Briggs was appointed coach of the Women's team.

The inaugural Hundred draft took place in October 2019 and saw the Rockets claim Joe Root as their headline men's draftee, and Natalie Sciver as the women's headliner. They are joined by England internationals Alex Hales and Dawid Malan for the men's team, while Katherine Brunt joins Sciver in the women's side.

Honours

Men's honours 

The Hundred
Winners: 2022
Third place: 2021

Women's honours 

The Hundred
Third place: 2022

Ground 

Both the Trent Rockets men's and women's sides play at the home of Nottinghamshire, Trent Bridge, in West Bridgford, Nottinghamshire. The women's side had been due to play at the home of Derbyshire County Cricket Club, the County Ground in Derby, and the home of Leicestershire, Grace Road but both teams were brought together at the same ground as a result of the Covid-19 pandemic

Players

Current squad

Men's side 
 Bold denotes players with international caps.
  denotes a player who is unavailable for rest of the season.

Men's captains
 Italics denote a temporary captain when the main captain was unavailable.

Women's side 
 Bold denotes players with international caps.
  denotes a player who is unavailable for rest of the season.

Women's captains
 Italics denote a temporary captain when the main captain was unavailable.

Seasons

Group stages

Knockout rounds

See also 

 List of Trent Rockets cricketers
 List of cricket grounds in England and Wales
 List of Test cricket grounds

References

Further reading 

 BBC: The Hundred player draft – covering the first draft signings for each region's team

External links 

 Official web page

Nottinghamshire County Cricket Club
Derbyshire County Cricket Club
Leicestershire County Cricket Club
Cricket in Nottinghamshire
Cricket in Derbyshire
Cricket in Leicestershire
Sport in Nottingham
Sport in Derby
Sport in Leicester
The Hundred (cricket) teams
2019 establishments in England
Trent Rockets